Eriocaulon rouxianum is a critically endangered monocotyledonous plant endemic to Mumbai and Nashik in the state of Maharashtra, India. It has not been recorded since 1982.

References

rouxianum
Flora of Maharashtra